Nathan Martin is an American long distance runner.

Running career 
As an amateur, Martin competed for Spring Arbor University where he was an NAIA champion.

In 2016, he finished 23rd in the 2016 United States Olympic Trials (track and field) in the marathon.

In 2020, he competed in the 2020 United States Olympic Trials (track and field) in the marathon.

Martin set the fastest marathon time by a black man born in the United States at the 2020 Marathon Project with a time of 2:11:05 besting Herman Atkins 1979 time of 2:11:52.

Martin finished 8th at the 2021 New York City Marathon, while also being the third American finisher.

Coaching career 
Martin is the cross country coach at Jackson High School (Michigan).

References 

Living people
American male long-distance runners
Year of birth missing (living people)